Naungmo is the name of several places in Burma:

Naungmo, Banmauk
 Naungmo, Bhamo